Lloyd Arthur Thompson (24 June 1932 Barbados – 28 August 1997) was a Nigerian classicist, and scholar.

Life
He graduated from St John's College, Cambridge, with an MA.
He taught at University of Ibadan Nigeria, for 40 years.

He married Alma Rosalind Platten on 1 September 1956; they had a daughter and two sons.

Awards
 1990 American Book Award

Works

References

Alumni of St John's College, Cambridge
1932 births
1997 deaths
Academic staff of the University of Ibadan
American Book Award winners